Galos may refer to:

Gálos, the Hungarian name of the town of Gols, Austria

People with the surname
Adam Galos (1924–2013), Polish historian
Giselle Galos, 19c. musician and composer

See also
Galo (disambiguation)
Gallo (disambiguation)